The Virginia Cavaliers college football team competes as part of the NCAA Division I Football Bowl Subdivision (FBS), representing the University of Virginia in the Coastal Division of the Atlantic Coast Conference (ACC). Since the establishment of the team in 1888, Virginia has appeared in 21 bowl games. The latest bowl occurred on December 30, 2019, when Virginia lost to Florida 36–28 in the 2019 Orange Bowl. The loss in that game brought the Cavaliers' overall bowl record to eight wins and thirteen losses (8–13).

Key

Bowl games

Notes

References
General

Specific

Virginia Cavaliers

Virginia Cavaliers bowl games